Percussion at Work is an album by composer, arranger and conductor Pete Rugolo featuring performances recorded in 1957 and first released on the EmArcy label.

Reception

The AllMusic review by Scott Yanow observed: "Some of arranger Pete Rugolo's Mercury and Emarcy recordings of the late 1950s seemed to concentrate more on getting effects than producing creative jazz. ... the album is primarily for hi-fi freaks and those who love percussion solos."

Track listing
All compositions by Pete Rugolo, except where indicated.
 "Artistry in Percussion" - 4:06
 "Fugue for Rhythm Section" - 3:35
 "1 + 4" - 4:30
 "Chorale for Brass, Piano, and Bongo" (Rugolo, Stan Kenton) - 3:01
 "Interplay for Drums, Brass" - 2:32
 "Funky Drums (André Previn, Larry Bunker, Shelly Manne,  Mel Lewis, Rugolo) - 4:05
 "Drumerama" (Eddie Cano) - 2:59
 "Bongo Riff" - 3:31
 "Percussion at Work" - 4:54

Recorded at Capitol Studios in Los Angeles, CA on November 5, 1957 (tracks 1, 3-5 & 8) and November 15, 1957 (tracks 2, 6, 7 & 9).

Personnel
Pete Rugolo - arranger, conductor
Buddy Childers, Don Fagerquist, Ed Leddy, Uan Rasey - trumpet (tracks 1, 3-5 & 8) 
Milt Bernhart, Herbie Harper, Frank Rosolino - trombone (tracks 1, 3-5 & 8)
Russell Brown - bass trombone (tracks 1, 3-5 & 8)
John Graas - French horn (tracks 1, 3-5 & 8) 
Clarence Karella - tuba (tracks 1, 3-5 & 8)
André Previn - piano
Al Portch - guitar 
Joe Mondragon - bass
Mel Lewis (tracks 2, 6, 7 & 9), Shelly Manne - drums
Larry Bunker - vibraphone, xylophone, timpani, drums
Jack Costanzo - bongos

References

Pete Rugolo albums
1958 albums
EmArcy Records albums
Albums arranged by Pete Rugolo
Albums conducted by Pete Rugolo

Albums recorded at Capitol Studios